I Need You is the third mini-album released by South Korean balladeer K.Will. It was released in Korea on February 14, 2012.

Track listing

References

External links
 Starship Entertainment
 
 K.Will's fan café on Daum 

2012 EPs
Korean-language EPs
K.Will EPs
Kakao M EPs